Milo Hathaway Lockwood  (April 7, 1858 – October 9, 1897), was a Major League Baseball outfielder and pitcher who played for the 1884 Washington Nationals of the Union Association.

Death
Lockwood became very ill and shot himself to death in 1897.

External links

1858 births
1897 deaths
Major League Baseball outfielders
Major League Baseball pitchers
Baseball players from Ohio
19th-century baseball players
Washington Nationals (UA) players
Johnstown (minor league baseball) players
Oil City (minor league baseball) players
People from Solon, Ohio